Thanbyuzayat Township is a township of Mawlamyine District in the Mon State of Myanmar.

Site of a War Cemetery and the Death Railway Museum, commemorating those POWs and Internees who died constructing the Burma-Siam Railway as slave labour during the Japanese occupation in World War II.

Townships of Mon State